Garry Thomas Lyle (born October 20, 1945) is a former American football safety in the National Football League (NFL). He was drafted by the Chicago Bears in the third round of the 1967 NFL Draft and played for seven years.

He played varsity college football at George Washington from 1964 to 1966, starting as tailback but quickly switching to quarterback, one of the first African Americans to play quarterback at a predominantly white institution. After injury, he continued as place kicker. He was the first African American to make All Conference. He was GW's last NFL draftee.

References

1945 births
Living people
George Washington Colonials football players
American football safeties
American football cornerbacks
American football running backs
American football quarterbacks
Chicago Bears players
People from New Martinsville, West Virginia
Players of American football from West Virginia